Bath City Football Club is a semi-professional football club based in Bath, Somerset, England. The club is affiliated to the Somerset FA and currently competes in the National League South, the sixth tier of English football. Nicknamed the “Romans” the club were founded in 1889 as Bath AFC, and changed names to Bath City in 1905. The club have played their home matches at Twerton Park since 1932.  

The club spent the first three years of its history in the early 1890s as Bath association football club. Bath won the Southern League Western Section in 1930, and again in 1933, which was viewed as the second best competition in England at the time. The club was heavily discussed for entry into the Football League Third Division during the 1930s, though Bath has missed out on election to the Football League on multiple occasions, including 1935, 1978 and in 1985. Upon the outbreak of the Second World War, the club won the Football League North – making them the only non-League football club to have ever won an English Football League trophy. Bath have reached the third round of the FA Cup six times, beating league sides such as; Crystal Palace (in 1931), Millwall (in 1959), and Cardiff City (in 1992).  The club were crowned Southern League champions  in 1960 and 1978; the top tier of non-League football at the time. After a period of relative decline in the 1990s, Bath were demoted to the seventh tier in 2004, the lowest tier the club has ever been in. Albeit, they were promoted in 2007, and again in 2010, and played tier five football for the first time since 1997, though the club were relegated in 2012 and have played in the National League South since.

Their main rivalries are with Yeovil Town and Chippenham Town. The club’s nickname stems from Bath's ancient Roman history. The first recorded attire the club wore was blue shorts and white shirts in 1900, though the club changed to black and white stripes in the early 20th Century and the colours have remained since. The club's crest depicts the Borough walls, which guarded the city during Roman times. Twerton Park; once held up to 20,000 fans but the Taylor Report in the late 1980s and the subsequent modernisation of football stadiums has more than halved that figure.

History

Formation and early years (1889–1925)

On July 19, 1889 Bath City were formed as Bath AFC (Bath Association Football Club) at the Christopher hotel in the city, a group of men met to consider forming an association club. Mr Cater formed the club and the team commenced play at the North Parade Ground in Bathwick. The club competed in their first ever recorded match on 10 October 1889, in which they lost 9–4 to Trowbridge Town at The North Parade Ground. One of the first games that Bath AFC played away was against Eastville Rovers in Clifton, Bristol in front of a crowd of 5,000 on 30 October 1889.

Fixtures in the club's primordial season included ties against the likes of, Weston-super-Mare, Swindon and Gloucester. The following season, Bath played regular friendlies with local Somerset sides, including the likes of Yeovil Casuals and Taunton United. By 1891, the club was struggling heavily financially. As a consequence, it was put forward that the club amalgamate with Bath Football Club.

For an entire nine years the club ceased play. Until, on 11 September 1900, Bath AFC was re-formed by members of the Bath Association Cricket Club, led by eventual player, William Hyman. A large meeting was called at the Railway hotel in James Street, to discuss, and in a viable form, an association football team to represented the city of Bath. The meeting was a success and thus Bath City FC, by name was officially born.  Hyman went on to score 131 goals for Bath, making him the club's second all-time top goal scorer, he also frequently acted as the club's honorary secretary in board meetings.

During the meeting at The Railway Hotel in which the club was formed, members suggested that the team's attire ought to be blue shorts and white shirts, though, these colours only lasted for a short while. In 1900, the club bought The Belvoir Castle Ground in East Twerton, next to the railway line and not too far from the River Avon . Concurrently, the club entered competitive football, commencing play in The Wiltshire Football League, finishing seventh in their first season.They changed names from Bath City to Bath Railway in 1902. That year, an annual competition known as the "Bath District League" was formed, in which the club competed against fellow local Bath clubs, such as Bath Rovers, Weston All Saints and Twerton Street Michaels.  On 26 July 1905, the club altered names for the final time, in which they reverted back to “Bath City FC”; the name has remained unchanged to the present day.
The following year, the club joined The Bristol and District League Division One, in which they remained for two years. In 1908, the club joined a multi-county  division for the first time, joining the Western League Division Two. After moving to a higher division, the club decided to field their reserve team for the Bath District League, instead of the first.

In 1909, Charles Pinker was appointed manager, and that year, the club moved up to The Western League Division One. Bath finished third at this level in the 1910–11 season. and then went on to rank second in The Western League Division One during the 1913–14 season.

Five years later, Bath City departed both The Belvoir Castle and Twerton, for the Lambridge Show Ground in Larkhall next to the River Avon. Bath remained in the Western League until 1921, in which they joined the English Section of the Southern League, regarded as the strongest league outside of the Football League League at the time.

In 1921, manager Charles Pinker left the club after a successful twelve-year period. He was replaced by former Swindon Town player, Billy Tout, who led the club into the top division of non-League football for the first time. Tout retained this role until 1925.

The Ted Davis years and missing out on Football League (1925–1958)

In 1925, Pinker was re-appointed at Bath City, though he failed to capture the same success in the Southern League as he had done in The Western League, finishing fourteenth and then eleventh. In August 1926, the club were on the brink of extinction, partly, due to the fans being "disheartened by the ill-fortune of recent seasons" and the lack of "sufficient backing".

However, on 21 August in 1926, there was a large meeting, consisting mostly of the clubs supporters and officials. Due to the appointment of a new committee, and the increase in the number of supporters' club shareholders, the required £500 sum was met, and the club was "saved".

A year later, Ted Davis was appointed at Bath City.  In 1929, Davis won the club their first competitive trophy, The Somerset Cup. The following season, the team finished first in the Southern League Western Section - the clubs highest-ever league placing.

Though Bath lost 3–2 in the play offs to Eastern Section Champions Aldershot Town, hence, they were less applicable for election to the Third Division. The season was labelled "the best in the club's history” by the Bath Chronicle at the time.

In 1932, the club returned to Twerton, and started playing home games at the newly built Twerton Park, with the community laying out flags and bunting the length of the High Street to "celebrate the return of football to the area."  The first game at the new ground was a match between Bristol Rovers Reserves and Bath City in the Southern League. 

The general feeling was one of relief, summed up by the Chronicle headline ‘All’s Well With Bath City.” Bath won 2-0 in front of 2,936. Manager Ted Davis’s new signing, Reg Trotman, a man whose football reputation had been made at Rovers, knocked in both goals for an “easy victory”. 

In 1933, the club won the Southern League Western Section for a second time, but lost again in the last final to play–off Eastern Section Champions Norwich City 2–1. 

During this period, the club were heavily being discussed for entry into the Football League Third Division. In 1937, Davis left Bath for Colchester United. The team remained in the Southern League until 1939, with former Liverpool player and Scottish international", Alex Raisbeck as first team coach from 1938 to 1939.

Raisbeck left to be replaced by Ted Davis, his second spell at Bath. In the summer of 1939, Arthur Mortimer was appointed as the clubs new chairman. Upon the Outbreak of the Second World War, the club were, by chance, accepted to join the temporary Football League North, competing with the likes of Liverpool, Manchester United, Aston Villa and Everton, finishing the eventual champions under Davis, thereby becoming the only semi-professional side ever to win a Football League trophy.

In the January of the 1941–42 season, Bath wore numbers for the very first time, playing Lovells Athletic in front of 5,000. In 1944, the club were, once again, in talks for entry into the English Football League, with the aim of being admitted into either the Third Division, or the planned Fourth Division, which had not yet been established. Bath were told during a meeting at the Guildhall by one of the leading members of the Football League reconstructing committee, that the opportunity to join the planned fourth division was " Bath's for the asking".  At the time, Twerton Park was also in heavy discussion for expansion, to a capacity of 40,000, in aim to become; "a stadium worthy of the city and the west".

However, on 27 July 1945, the Football League's management committee refused to allow any non-league clubs into the Third Division, despite Third League clubs "wanting Bath City to join". Thus, after the War, with the resumption of competitive football, they were forced to resume playing in the Southern League, and the plans to make Twerton Park one of the largest stadiums in the West Country were abandoned. Ted Davis, then left the club in 1947. In total, Davis spent 17 years as first team coach. He went on to become the most successful and longest serving manager in the club's history, winning seven trophies.

Following his departure, the 1950s saw a large array of different coaches manage the club. Vic Woodley was the first to succeed Davis, appointed on 6 June 1947. Though he left in 1950 after four mid-lower placed finishes, and was replaced by Eddie Hapgood. Attendances on average during the 1940s and 1950s were some of the highest recorded in the club's history.

Notable large home attendances during this period included; 17,000 in 1944 vs Aston Villa 14,000 vs Southend United in the 1952–53 season and 11,700 at Twerton Park against rivals Yeovil Town in 1957. In 1956, Hapgood left the club after winning two Somerset Cups in 1952 and 1953. He was replaced by Paddy Sloan, who only remained for the 1956–57 season.

Further glory and the yoyo years (1958–1997)

Sloan was replaced by Bob Hewison in 1957. The succeeding year, a reform similar to that of 1920 took place; a new Fourth Division was formed. Thereupon, The Southern league descended the pyramid. By 1959, Bath were once again being heavily discussed for election to The Football League.

However the chairman at the time, Arthur Mortimer, believed that "the league suited the club" he stated that: "We are providing better football here than most spectators get in the lower divisions of the Football League."

Hewison built arguably, the strongest side in the clubs history, signing players such as, Stan Mortensen, Charlie Fleming, Alan Skirton, Ian MacFarlane and Ian Black, captained by Tony Book. The team went on to win the league in the 1959–60 season, at rivals Yeovil Town, finishing on 67 points (in 42 matches), with the division still being viewed as; “The foremost non-League competition.”

In the same season, the club had one of the best cup runs in their history, beating Millwall in the FA Cup first round, with Millwall manager Reg Smith describing the game as "brutal, the roughest I have seen in 20 years." and then Notts County in the second round. In the third round, Bath went on to play Brighton & Hove Albion at Twerton Park, in front of a record crowd of 18,020, but lost 1–0.  Hewison rose as the second most successful manager in the club's history, a title in which he held until 1978. In 1962, Bath were Southern League runners up. 

Two years after Hewison's departure in the spring of 1961, Former Manchester City player Malcolm Allison was appointed manager after Arthur Cole's dismissal in 1963. Though Allison won no silverware with the club, in the 1963–64 season, with Tony Book as club captain, Bath finished in third place, and reached the third round of the FA Cup. He left the club in 1964 and then went on to manage league sides, including, Plymouth Argyle and Manchester City.

In 1965, under Welsh manager Ivor Powell, the club were relegated for the first time in their history. They were then promoted back to the Southern League Premier Division that year, though were poor in the 1966–67 season and finished 19th, being relegated from the Southern League Premier for a second time in three years. Powell was replaced by Arnold Rodgers on 25 February 1967. In the 1968–69 season they won promotion back to the Premier Division, finishing second. From 1964 to 1974 Bath City became a yo-yo club, being relegated from, and promoted back to the Premier Division on six occasions.
On 10 August 1976, Brian Godfrey was appointed as manager. Two years into his reign, in the 1977–78 season, the team won the Southern League title for a second time. The Southern League in the 1970s was still labelled: “the best non-league division in England.” Under Godfrey, the club made it to two Anglo-Italian Cup finals In 1977 and 1978; In 1977, they lost to Udinese Calcio and then in 1978 to affiliated club Calcio Lecco. Godfrey averaged a league position of third, and won Bath City's last "major" non-League trophy, making him the clubs second most successful manager of all time. 

Though finishing first, they fell short of election to the Football League by three votes in 1978, with Wigan Athletic gaining 26 and Bath 23. As a result, the club became founding members of the Alliance Premier League, now the National League. They finished runners-up in 1985 but champions Wealdstone did not meet Football League stadium capacity requirements, so Bath City were allowed to apply for election to the Football League Fourth Division. However, they missed out on election to the Football League for a third time. On this occasion, gaining only 8 votes.

In 1986, Bristol Rovers were forced out of Eastville, officials of both clubs reached an agreement to share Twerton Park. This instigated developments to the ground as it, at one point, hosted second-tier football. Rovers ultimately moved back to Bristol after a ten-year period. In 1988, Bath were relegated from the Alliance Premier League to the Southern Football League, which was now formally the sixth tier. Nevertheless, the club were promoted back the next season.

In 1991 Tony Ricketts was appointed manager, replacing George Rooney.  They reached the third round of the FA Cup during the 1993–94 season, on 5 December 1993, the second round tie against Hereford United was broadcast live on Sky Sports. The club won 2–1, progressing to the next round. However, they lost 4–1 to Stoke City at home in the third. That season, the club won the Somerset Cup, and won it again in 1995. They remained in the fifth tier from 1991 to 1997, though only managed several mid-placed finishes.

Decline and subsequent relegation (1997–2017)

In the wake of Ricketts's departure in 1996, Paul Bodin was appointed manager. Following decades of playing in the top division of non-League football, the club were relegated from the 1996–97 Football Conference. As a result, Bath returned to the Southern Football League; albeit it no longer acted as step one of the non league pyramid. In 2001, Bodin was replaced by Alan Pridham. However Pridham only lasted until  2003, after being sacked in November due to a poor run of results.  In 2004, the club lost in the FA Cup second round to Peterborough United and in the third round of the FA Trophy to Canvey Island.

With the formation of the Conference South in 2004, the Southern league lowered in rank once again; to the seventh division. As a result, Bath were demoted, albeit, without being relegated. Subsequently, they ended up playing the lowest tier football in the club's history from 2004 to 2007, having never previously played below the sixth tier.   John Relish was appointed manager on 22 June 2005. The club narrowly missed out on promotion to the Conference South in the season 2005–06 season finishing second in the Southern League. Though, the subsequent year, they were promoted back to the sixth tier by winning the Southern League in 2006–07, finishing on 91 points.

Bath then finished eighth in the Conference South during the 2007–08 season. In October 2008, manager John Relish was replaced by his former assistant Adie Britton. In 2009, the club beat League Two side Grimsby Town in the FA Cup first round, only to lose to Forest Green Rovers in the second round. On 9 May 2010, Bath reached the National League South play-off final, in which they played Woking. The club won 1–0 and returned to the fifth tier for the first time since 1997. Bath finished tenth in the 2010–11 Football Conference, their highest finish since achieving seventh in the 1992–93 Football Conference. 
However, they had a poor season in 2011–12 and were relegated from the Conference. Following the demotion, Bath's chairman at the time, Manda Rigby, held talks with manager Adie Britton on the future of the club, stating the team would; "return stronger with the experience." Yet the chairman's promise to get back into the National League failed to materialise, with the club finishing in twelfth place in the 2012–13 season. Britton, subsequently stepped down from being the first team coach, and acquired the role of football director, stating that he "aims to get Bath City back to where they belong."Britton was replaced by Australian manager, Lee Howells. The following season was an improvement, with the club finishing seventh on 66 points in 2013–14. However, for the following two years, they were poor again, finishing fourteenth on 53 points in both the 2014–15 and 2015–16 season. During this period, the club's home attendances also declined greatly, averaging as low as 500 during the 2014–15 season. From 2011 to 2016 home attendances were some of the lowest recorded in the club's entire history.

What little success the club had during this period was in the 2014–15 season, reaching the semi-final of the FA Trophy, beating Bristol Rovers, on route to losing on penalties to eventual winners, North Ferriby United. Howells was eventually sacked after a 4–1 defeat to Dartford, due to a run of low placed finishes.

2017–present 
On 5 October 2017, former player, Jerry Gill, was appointed first team manager. The first season under Gill saw the club finish in ninth, the same as the previous 2016–17 season. However, it was not until later that there was a noticeable improvement in the team's performances.

In the 2018–19 National League South season the club finished fifth, on 71 points, a feat that had not been accomplished since the 2009–10 promotion season. Subsequently, they entered play offs to compete for a place in the National League, but lost 3–1 to Wealdstone on the first May 2019.

The club climbed once spot higher up the table again in 2019–20, finishing fourth. However, the team were beaten 2–1 by Dorking Wanderers in the play-off eliminator at Twerton Park.

Attendances also rose greatly, from the club averaging 612 in the 2016–17 season to 1,142 in the 2018–19 season. They also witnessed the highest league attendance in 40 years vs Torquay United, on 19 January 2019, with a crowd of 3,492. Bath won the game 3–2.

Crest and colours

Crest

Bath's initial crest was heavily based on the official coat of arms for the city of Bath. The shield depicts the Borough Wall, the mineral springs and the River Avon, and the sword is that of St Paul, one of the Patron Saints of the Abbey, which is also the cities' parish church.

The crest remained until the 1975, in which it was simplified heavily, the features within the city of bath shield were removed entirely, all that remained were 4 vertical black stripes against a white background surrounding the silhouette of a Roman soldier. It was then changed again in 1999, as the crest that the club uses today.  The Roman soldier was removed, but the borough wall was re-added and the 4 stripes enlarged.

Colours
The club are sometimes given the nickname; "The Stripes" simply in remembrance to their striped kit, as Bath have worn black and white throughout the majority of their history. They are also one of the few English clubs from the sixth tier and above to wear a black and white striped kit at home matches, the only other club's being, Grimsby Town, Notts County, Chorley and Newcastle United.

Kit suppliers and shirt sponsors

Stadiums

Early grounds
Bath played their most early matches at the North Parade Ground in Bathwick across from the City Centre. The ground was shared with the cricket club, most likely due to the fact that members of Bath Cricket Club were involved in the formation of the club in 1889. The ground mainly hosted friendlies with Bath and other local teams. However, their time at Bathwick was short spent, as they moved to Lambridge in 1890.

1900–1919: Belvoir Castle 

In 1900, the club settled in Twerton at the Belvoir Castle Ground. From 1900 to 1908 the club played friendlies with other local clubs. In 1908, there was a talk of Bath Rugby sharing the ground, though the talks never materialised.Notable achievements at the Ground included; finishing third in the Western League in 1911, and then second in 1914. In 1910 the ground was purchased by the Midland Railway Company by Mr Stothert and Pitt, it was later stated that the ground would be "absolutely unsuitable for football" in a few years time, with the Railway Company planning to build a train track on the very land that the stadium occupied. In 1919, a large meeting was arranged at the Bath Guildhall to find a suitable replacement, the Recreation Ground was considered an option.

1919–1932: Lambridge 

After almost a decade of uncertainty of what the club's next ground was going to be, following the purchase by the Midland Railway Company in 1910, Mr Hopkins, the club's secretary at the time, found a viable replacement for Belvoir. Thus, in 1919, the club moved away from Twerton back to the east side of the city in Lambridge. In 1921 Bath were accepted into the Southern League Western Section, the top tier of non-League football.

Here, under manager, Ted Davis, they had one of the most successful periods in the club's history, as the southern league West at the time acted as the fourth tier, being only one division below the Football League Third Division. Not only did the club play some of the highest division football in their history during this period, the club won the title in the 1929–30 season and also won the Somerset Premier Cup twice, in the 1928–29 and the 1931–32 season. In the last season at Lambridge the club came third in the league and also reached the FA Cup third round, but were knocked out by Crystal Palace.

1932–present: Twerton Park

Twerton Park became the club's home ground in 1932. The club continued the success of the latter years at Lambridge by winning the Southern League Western title in their first season at Twerton in the 1932–33 season. In 1935, roofing was added to the Popular Side. In 1946, Twerton Park was described as "rivalling any stadium in the west of England." A record attendance of 18,020 was recorded in 1960 versus Brighton & Hove Albion in the third round of the FA Cup.Up until the late 1980s, the ground had a capacity of 20,000. Between 1986 and 1996, Bath City shared Twerton Park with Bristol Rovers. In 1990 the Grandstand was heavily damaged by Bristol City Hooligans, who were later convicted of arson. Rovers notably played Liverpool in the FA cup on 5 February 1992.  It has also hosted Team Bath, who were a full-time professional team playing in the Conference South until their resignation at the end of the 2008–09 season. In 2021, the stadium was ranked the 75th best in Britain by FourFourTwo, ahead of the likes of, Charlton Athletic's The Valley, the Swansea.com stadium and Bristol City's Ashton Gate. The ground currently has a reduced ground capacity of 3,528 from 8,800 due to safety regulations with a seating capacity of 1,006.

On 21 August 2008, Bath City's chairman Geoff Todd stated that "the club held talks with Bath Rugby over a possible ground share at the Rec" meaning in the future, Bath City could move to the Recreation Ground, though fans were opposed to the move. At the end of the 2011–12 season the club offered the naming rights to Twerton Park for just £50. The offer drew 167 entries from as far afield as the US, Australia, Norway and Singapore which raised £3,850 for the club. Businesses made up 58 of the entries with only a handful of the remaining personalised entries being deemed unsuitable. The winning entry drawn at random was The Mayday Trust, a charitable organisation that helps to rehome vulnerable people.

The club released plans to redevelop the ground and local area, containing a new grandstand, 3G pitch and housing in a bid to secure the immediate financial future of the club. In March 2020, the plans were rejected. In August 2020, it was announced that Bristol City Women would play the majority of home games at Twerton Park during the 2020–21 FA Women's Super League season.

Support 

Historically, Bath were one of the best supported clubs in non-league football, particularly in the 1940s, 1950s and 1960s. With attendances reaching the mid to late ten thousands in some FA Cup ties. In an interview in 1997, chairman at the time, Steve Hall stated: "In the days when Malcolm Allison was here (1950s) we'd have 5,000 turn up every Saturday."

However, attendances declined immensely in the 1970s, 80s and 90s, with no average home gate making it over 1,400 mark besides the 1977–78 season (with an average of 1,600). Albeit, the decline in attendances was notable through out the entirety of English football during this period as they were some of the foremost decades of Football hooliganism, particularly the 1980s. Due to the club's poor performances on the field in the late 1990s to 2010s, with subsequent relegations, attendances declined further. Being as low as 500 on average in the 2014–15 season, the lowest recorded average attendance in the club's entire history. As a result, in 2015, a fan development group dedicated to raising average home attendances to 1000 called "1000BC" was put in place. The development was undoubtedly successful with attendances having averaged over 1000 for the past three seasons.

For the current 2022–23 season Twerton Park was ranked number one by non league fans for atmosphere in the national league south. The Popular Side opposite the Grand Stand is home to the club's most vocal support. Supporters are known for singing "Drink Up Thy Cider" by The Wurzels, a tribute to the Somerset's famous cider brewing industry. The song is often played at Twerton Park after the team wins, particularly a big game.In the 1960s and 1970s, the club's mascot was simply known as "mascot man", who dressed in black and white top hat and tails whilst twirling a large black and white umbrella and ringing a handbell. In more recent years, (since the 2010–11 season), the club mascot has been Bladud the Pig, named after the legendary king of the Britons who is said to have founded the city of Bath and kept a herd of pigs. At the club's home games, he can frequently be seen waving to the crowd, performing press-ups and entertaining younger supporters. In 2019, Bladud the Pig won the Mascot South West Grand National.

Though close in proximity, EFL League One side Bristol Rovers are not considered rivals, having never competed against Bath in the league, and have formed friendly relations with the Romans, largely due to Rovers playing at Twerton from 1986 to 1996.

In addition to Bristol Rovers, Bath have formed a strong tie with Italian side Calcio Lecco. The clubs played against each other in the 1977 Anglo-Italian Cup Final, with the Italian side triumphing. This did not sour relations, with fans of both sides celebrating the 40th anniversary of the game in 2017 with a supporters match held in Lecco's Stadio Rigamonti-Ceppi ground.

Rivalries 

Historically, Bath's mains rivals were fellow Somerset club Yeovil Town. Bath also shared a lesser rivalry with Weymouth. The rivalry with Yeovil stemmed from location and league position, with Yeovil and Bath having played in the top tier of non-League football for the majority of their history. Tensions between Bath and Yeovil were said to be strongest in the 1960s and 1990s, with the two clubs playing each other 272 times. From the 1910s to the late 1990s Bath and Yeovil consistently occupied the same league.

The first game for which the grandstand at Twerton Park officially opened was an FA Cup-tie on November 12, 1932. Yeovil, at the time, were said to be much “much reviled” in Bath over the years. 5,345 watched Yeovil beat Bath 4–2. The paper reported that the crowd were ‘strangely silent’,  with City fans stating “Losing to Yeovil always hurt”.

However, since the turn of the century, Yeovil and Bath moved in opposite directions across the English football pyramid, with the two clubs being as many as five divisions apart from one another during the 2013–14 season. Yeovil were promoted to the EFL Championship in 2013, and played second-tier football for the first time in their history during the 2013–14 season, at the same time, Bath were struggling in the sixth tier. Whilst Yeovil were having one of the best periods in their history, Bath were having one their worst, thus, local animosity between Bath and Yeovil dissipated.

The relegation of Weymouth from the National League in 2019 means that both Weymouth and Bath now participate in the National League South as of the 2022–23 season, the last time being the 2009–10 season. Yeovil Town's decline since 2014 means that as of the 2022–23 season Bath currently sit just one tier below. In more recent years, Bath have shared a less fierce derby with Chippenham Town both based on location and league position rather than historical feud, with both clubs competing in the National League South as of the 2022–23 season.

Records and statistics

The record appearance maker is Dave Mogg, who made 515 appearances in all competitions. Charlie Fleming is the club's top goal scorer with 216 goals. William Hyman, Martin Paul, Paul Randall have all scored over 100 goals for the club. The highest goals scored by a single player in a season was Paul Randall in the 1989–90 season.

The highest transfer fee received by the club is £80,000 for Jason Dodd, paid by Southampton in 1989.  The highest fee paid by Bath is £16,000 for Micky Tanner signed from Bristol City in 1988.

The club's record attendance is 18,020 against Brighton & Hove Albion in the third round of the FA Cup.

Current ownership

Community ownership
In the summer of 2015, "Big Bath City Bid" was launched by filmmaker and Bath fan Ken Loach, in aim to convert Bath City into a community-owned, ‘one member one vote’ club, and to clear the club of its debts. That year, the Bid fell short of the £750,000 target set by the majority shareholders. Albeit, in September 2016, the appeal achieved the  £300,000 target, and thus began its reformation to a community-owned asset. The scheme received backing from around the world, including support from ex-Manchester Utd footballer, Eric Cantona.

On 5 May 2017, the club completed its transition to community ownership. The major shareholder is the “Bath City Supporters Society Ltd” with 54.6%. However, the figures, for May 2018, showed the club operating at a loss of approximately £137,000. Since 2017, the club has also begun altering the way it operates and has tried tapping into new revenue streams. However, the club continues to face financial difficulties; with debts totalling almost £1 million in 2018, all of which need to be repaid by 2022 at the latest.

Nick Blofeld, stated; "Despite the community buy-out the Club still has substantial debts to clear and is running at an on-going loss, so we must create sustainable income streams if we are to remain at Twerton Park for long-term. We have generated some more revenue from non-football activities, but this is limited by our current facilities, which are very dated and are no longer fit-for-purpose. We are all committed to making sure the club remains part of the Twerton community, which is why we have teamed up with Greenacre Capital to pursue plans for a partial redevelopment. "But if these proposals do not happen we would not be able to improve the club's business model sufficiently to clear its debts. In this scenario we might have to sell the entire site and look for a new ground elsewhere, probably outside of the city."

On 16 March 2020, the National League Board announced the suspension of all National League football until at least 3 April, due to the rapidly developing COVID-19 pandemic. On 31 March, the suspension was extended indefinitely and, on 22 April, all remaining league matches were cancelled. Supporters donated £53,025 to help stopple the extra costs of participating in the playoffs.

In the 2021–22 season, the club established a livestreaming service, enabling supporters to remotely watch games played at Twerton Park. On 22 January 2021, with increasing uncertainty about continued financial support for non-League member clubs, the National League Board announced that the National League South would be halted immediately for a two-week period.

Players

First-team squad

Former players

Player records

Club captains 
The following table shows players who have previously been selected to be club captain. The table is in chronological order and begins from 1984 onwards:

Notable former players

Bath City have a long list of notable former players. Notable players in recent times include the likes of; Bobby Zamora and Paul Evans.

During the 1950s and 1960s, many players that established themselves in the First Division (now Premier League), stepped out onto the Twerton Park pitch in black and white over 100 times, such players include:

Alan Skirton

Winger, Alan Skirton was born in Bath in 1939. Skirton made 144 appearances for the club between 1956 and 1959, scoring 44 goals. After winning the Southern League with Bath City in 1960, Skirton went on to play for Arsenal, playing for the Gunners over 145 times between 1960 and 1966, scoring 53 goals.

Charle Fleming

Scottish born striker Charlie Fleming made 107 appearances for the then First Division Sunderland between 1955 and 1958 scoring 60 goals. Known as “Cannonball” for his shooting ability. Fleming moved to Bath in 1958 and scored 206 goals for the Romans until his departure in 1966, making him the clubs records goal scorer. After his death in 1997, the bar outside of Twerton Park was re-named; “Charlie’s” in his honour.

Ian Black

Goalkeeper, Ian Black, was born in Scotland in 1924. He joined the then Second Division Southampton in 1947, and played 97 games for them until 1950. In which he joined Fulham, playing 263 matches for the cottagers in both the Second and First Division in the 9 years he was with them. In 1959, Black joined the Romans and helped the club win the 1959-60 Southern League title, Black made over 143 appearances for Bath City until he left in 1962.

Stan Mortensen

Arguably the greatest player to ever play for the club, Stan Mortensen was born in 1921. In 1941, Mortensen joined Blackpool F.C. who were one of the best teams in England at the time. He went on to make over 352 appearances for the tangerines, scoring 227 goals, making him Blackpool’s second highest goal scorer of all time. In the 1953 FA Cup final Mortensen became the first ever player to score a hat-trick in a FA Cup final at Wembley. Internationally, Mortensen won 25 caps for England, scoring 23 goals. He signed for The Romans for the 1958–59 season, in which he made 40 appearances and scored 27 goals.

Tony Book

Right back, Tony Book was born in Bath in 1938. Book went on to make 385 appearances for the club, captaining Bath to the 1960 Southern League. At the age of 31, he moved to Manchester City and captained them to a First Division, FA Cup, EFL Cup, and UEFA Cup Winners' Cup title, making him their second most decorated captain of all time, after Vincent Kompany.

Club officials
The current manager is Jerry Gill, who was appointed in October 2017. Gill previously played for the club between 1990 and 1996, making over 200 appearances.

Coaching and medical staff

Board of directors

Managerial history
From 1907 onwards, caretaker managers are not included

Honours

In terms of the significance and prestige of trophies won, Bath are the second most successful club that currently play in the National League South, after Kent club, Dartford. Bath's first competitive trophy was The Somerset Premier Cup in 1929. In 1930, the club won its first League title, The Southern League Western Section, (acting as the fourth division at the time). In terms of the grandeur and number of trophies won, Bath's most successful decade was the 1930s, in which the club won two league titles and three Somerset cups.

In total, Bath have won two Southern League Western Section titles – 1929–30, 1930–33, two Southern League titles – 1959–60, 1977–78, one Southern Football League title – 2006–07, one Southern League Cup, one non league championship trophy, one Football League North – 1943–44 and twenty four Somerset Premier Cups. In total Bath have won four ‘major’ non-League trophies, and twenty seven overall.

Domestic

League
 Southern League (Western Section) (Tier 4)
 Winners (2): 1929–30, 1932–33  
 Southern League Premier(Tier 5)
 Winners (2): 1959–60, 1977–78
 Conference South (Tier 6)
Play-off winners:  2009–10
 Southern League (Tier 7)
 Winners: 2006–07
Football League North
 Winners: 1943–44

Cups
 Southern League Cup
 Winners: 1978–79
Somerset Premier Cup
 Winners (24): 1928–29, 1931–32, 1933–34, 1935–36, 1945–46, 1946–47 (shared), 1951–52, 1952–53, 1957–58, 1959–60, 1965–66, 1967–68, 1969–70, 1977–78, 1980–81, 1981–82, 1983–84, 1984–85, 1985–86, 1988–89, 1989–90, 1993–94, 1994–95, 2007–08

European
 Anglo-Italian Cup
 Runners up: 1976–77, 1977–78

See also

Bath City W.F.C.
List of Bath City F.C. records and statistics
List of Bath City F.C. managers
List of Bath City F.C. players
List of Bath City F.C. seasons
List of fan-owned sports teams

Affiliated clubs 

  Calcio Lecco

Notes

References

Further Reading

Sources

Player lists

External links

Official website
Bath City Youth FC website 
Bath City F.C. on BBC Sport: results and fixtures
Vanarama National League Official website
Supporters' Society
Supporters' Club

 
Football clubs in England
National League (English football) clubs
City F.C.
Association football clubs established in 1889
Southern Football League clubs
1889 establishments in England
Football clubs in Somerset
Fan-owned football clubs in England
Railway association football teams in England